Live at Maybeck Recital Hall, Volume Two is an album of solo performances by jazz pianist Dave McKenna, recorded in 1989.

Music and recording
The album was recorded in November 1989 at the Maybeck Recital Hall in Berkeley, California. Some of the tracks are medleys and are based on themes in the titles.

Release and reception

It was released by Concord Records. The AllMusic reviewer concluded: "Beautifully recorded and performed, this valuable CD was one of many Maybeck titles that was unfortunately deleted from Concord's active catalog."

Track listing
"Spoken Introduction"
"Dream Dancing"
"Detour Ahead"
"Exactly Like You"
"I'm Glad There Is You/I'm Glad I Waited for You"
"Knowledge Medley: Teach Me Tonight/School Days/An Apple for the Teacher/I Didn't Know About You"
"Knowledge Medley (Part 2): I Didn't Know What Time It Was/I Wish I Knew/I Don't Know Enough About You"
"I Don't Know Why (I Just Do)/You'll Never Know"
"I Never Knew"
"'C' Jam Blues"
"Limehouse Blues"

Personnel
Dave McKenna – piano

References

1989 live albums
Albums recorded at the Maybeck Recital Hall
Concord Records live albums
Solo piano jazz albums